Jim Edwards  (1874 – 1939) was a Welsh international footballer. He was part of the Wales national football team between 1895 and 1897, playing 3 matches. He played his first match on 16  March 1895 against Ireland and his last match on 29 March 1897 against England.

See also
 List of Wales international footballers (alphabetical)

References

External links
 
 

1874 births
Place of birth missing
Date of death missing
1939 deaths
Welsh footballers
Wales international footballers
Association football defenders
Oswestry Town F.C. players